The North Panola School District is a public school district based in Sardis, Mississippi (USA).

In addition to Sardis, the district also serves the town of Como and the Panola County portion of Crenshaw as well as rural areas in northern Panola County.

Schools
North Panola High School (Sardis; Grades 9-12)
North Panola Junior High School (Como, Grades 6-8)
Crenshaw Elementary School (Crenshaw; Grades K-5)
Como Elementary School (Como; Grades PK-5)
Greenhill Elementary School (Sardis; Grades K-6)

Demographics

2006-07 school year
There were a total of 1,834 students enrolled in the North Panola School District during the 2006–2007 school year. The gender makeup of the district was 48% female and 52% male. The racial makeup of the district was 96.95% African American, 2.67% White, 0.27% Hispanic, and 0.11% Asian. 86.6% of the district's students were eligible to receive free lunch.

Previous school years

Accountability statistics

See also

List of school districts in Mississippi

References

External links

 Panola Remembers: A History of Panola Education by Prof. Carl Edwin Lindgren, 1996. Morris Publishing Co. The book is also on-line at Panola Remembers: A History of Panola Education

Education in Panola County, Mississippi
School districts in Mississippi